Alūksne New Castle is a castle in the city of Alūksne in eastern Latvia. It was built between 1859 and 1864 by Baron Alexander von Vietinghoff in the English Gothic Revival style.

References 

Alūksne
Castles in Latvia